Wild almond is a common name for several plants and may refer to:

Wild growing forms of the almond, Prunus amygdalus, native to the Middle East and South Asia
Brabejum stellatifolium, native to South Africa
Irvingia malayana, native to southeast Asia
Prunus fasciculata, native to the southwestern United States
Prunus turneriana, native to Papua New Guinea and Australia
Sterculia foetida, native to the Old World tropics